GR-89696 is a drug which acts as a highly selective κ-opioid agonist. It shows selective effects in different animal models and it is thought it may be a subtype-selective agonist for the κ2 subtype. Recent studies have suggested that GR-89696 and related κ2-selective agonists may be useful for preventing the itching which is a common side effect of conventional opioid analgesic drugs, without the additional side effects of non-selective kappa agonists.

References

Synthetic opioids
Chlorobenzenes
Acetamides
Piperazines
Pyrrolidines
Kappa-opioid receptor agonists